Emily Cranz (born 21 September 1942) is an American-born Mexican actress, singer, and dancer.

Early life

She was born Emma Cranz Cantillano, in Tucson, Arizona, one of 6 children (3 boys and 3 girls) to a German-American father, Frank C., who was born in Oakland, CA and a Mexican mother, Evangelina (née Amillano) (1909-1964), who was born in Sinaloa, Mexico.

In 1953, as a 10-year-old girl, Cranz participated as a dancer and singer in community events in Tucson, Arizona.  In February of that year, at the Mission View PTA meeting, which took place in the school auditorium, Cranz and a schoolmate were featured in a group of Mexican dances.  Then, she participated in the September 16 Mexican Independence Day Celebration as a dancer and singer, who serenaded the Lady of Guadalupe. Her mother, Evangelina, was an organizer, and her sister, whose name was also Evangelina, was a dancer, as well.  The program was broadcast over station KVOA.

As a teenager, she sang at benefits and on a local radio station.  At the age of 13, she appeared on television, which did not make a big impression, so her parents moved to Los Angeles, California to try to have her break in as a professional singer.  Later, she joined the Chuck Rio Quintet in Las Vegas and performed with them for several seasons. She left the group to record with Orfeón in Mexico.

Career

In 1961, Cranz began her career as a Mexican recording artist on the Peerless label, backed up by Los Boppers, singing "Ahora o Nunca" and on the flip-side "Papa Loves Mambo" on a 45 rpm single.  Later, she recorded on the Maya, Orfeón, Dimsa, and RCA Victor labels various singles and albums in Spanish, and, most notably, an English album (backed by the Mariachi Guadalajara) called "Speak to Me."

In 1962, she appeared on the Paco Malgesto program every Saturday night on KWEX-TV Ch.41 in San Antonio, Texas.

From 1963 to 1970, Cranz appeared in Mexican movies, television variety shows, and telenovelas (soap operas), where, in addition to acting, she would frequently sing or dance.  She considered herself to be a "vedette" (a showgirl), rather than a serious actress.

One of her more popular appearances was in 1966, when she co-starred with Gaspar Henaine as Capulina in La cigüeña distraída (1966), a comedy film directed by Emilio Gómez Muriel.

She also accompanied show troupes and performed in different cities.  In 1962, she was a member of a Mexico City troupe—complete with recording artists, dancers, and mariachis—that headlined the annual Fiesta de Mayo celebration in her home town of Tucson.

In 1970, she appeared on U.S. television in the Bob Hope Comedy Special, which was set in Acapulco during the Mexico International Film Festival.

Retirement

She seemed to have retired from the entertainment scene in 1970, as reflected in no new projects on her list of credits on IMDB after 1970.

Charitable causes

The Emily Cranz foundation in Houston, Texas honored legendary Mexican comedian Mario Moreno "Cantinflas" with its 1992 Gracias Award for his work on behalf of children.  The charity benefit raised money to aid children living in crisis environments.

Selected filmography
La cigüeña distraída (1966)

Citations

External links

Emily Cranz songs at Freegal Music

1942 births
20th-century Mexican actresses
Actresses from Tucson, Arizona
American emigrants to Mexico
American people of German descent
Chicano
Living people
Mexican American
Mexican women singers
Mexican female dancers
Mexican people of German descent